Clan of the White Lotus is a 1980 Shaw Brothers kung fu film directed by Lo Lieh, with action choreography by Lau Kar Leung, and starring Lo Lieh and Gordon Liu. It is released as Fists of the White Lotus in North America.

The film follows on the 1977 film Executioners from Shaolin and 1979 film Abbot of Shaolin.

Synopsis
Following the death of his brother Pai Mei, Priest White Lotus seeks revenge with one idea in mind: to kill his brother's assassins. One night, he decides to pay them a surprise visit and murders one of the two. But the survivor of that night, will withdraw from the world and, with the help of the widow of the deceased, will perfect his technique to take his revenge...

Cast
 Lo Lieh: Priest White Lotus
 Gordon Liu: Man Ting Hung
 Kara Hui: Mei-Hsiao (as Ying Hung Wei)
 Fai Wong Lam: Wu Nai Shing
 Johnny Wang: Ko Chun Chung
 Yeung Ching-Ching: Siu Ching
 King Chu Lee: Wu Ah Biu
 Hsiao Ho: Personal Swordsman of White Lotus
 Wilson Tong: Priest White Brow (as Tang Wei-shing)

Reception
Andrew Saroch describes the film as "Another awesome Shaw Brothers film with an insane concept and some heavenly fight action choreographed by the one and only Liu Chia-Liang."

The authors of The Encyclopedia of Martial Arts Movies rate the film a maximum of four stars, praising the film's "partially evocative music" and "amazing martial arts".

References

External links 
 Clan of the White Lotus at Hong Kong Cinemagic
 
 

1980 films
Hong Kong films about revenge
Films about cults
Shaw Brothers Studio films
Kung fu films
Films set in 19th-century Qing dynasty
Hong Kong martial arts films
1980s Hong Kong films